Provincial Trunk Highway 50 (PTH 50) is a provincial highway in the south-central region of the Canadian province of Manitoba. It runs from PTH 16 to PTH 5 and PR 361 in the village of McCreary.

Like PTH 5 and PTH 20, PTH 50 does not run its entire length in one direction. The highway is designated as a north-south highway between PTH 16 and the hamlet of Silver Ridge, where it meets PR 278. From Silver Ridge to McCreary, the highway's designation changes to east-west.

PTH 50 provides access to the western shore of Lake Manitoba. The speed limit is 90 km/h (55 mph).

History 
PTH 50 first appeared on the 1953 Manitoba Highway Map.

When it was first added, PTH 50 was an east-west route connecting PTH 5 at McCreary to Silver Ridge. The highway's north-south segment was added in 1956.

References

050